Ellen Marie Forland (21 August 1926 – 22 January 2010) was a Norwegian businessperson.

She hailed from Storebø, took her secondary education in Bergen and studied chemistry in Copenhagen. She married Mikkel Forland in 1953, and they cooperated in the business world until 1973, when her husband decided to be a ship broker while Ellen Marie Forland wanted to be a ship-owner. She started the company E. Forland. In 2007 she was awarded the King's Medal of Merit in gold. She ran the company until her death in 2010, following complications after a heart surgery.

References

1926 births
2010 deaths
People from Austevoll
Norwegian businesspeople in shipping
Recipients of the King's Medal of Merit in gold
Norwegian expatriates in Denmark
20th-century Norwegian businesswomen
20th-century Norwegian businesspeople
21st-century Norwegian businesswomen
21st-century Norwegian businesspeople